Exocentroides is a genus of beetles in the family Cerambycidae, containing the following species:

subgenus Exocentroides
 Exocentroides flavovarius Breuning, 1957
 Exocentroides multispinicollis Breuning, 1957
 Exocentroides unispinicollis Breuning, 1957

subgenus Trichexocentroides
 Exocentroides flavipennis Breuning, 1957

References

Acanthocinini
Taxa named by Stephan von Breuning (entomologist)